Palaeotoma is a genus of moths belonging to the subfamily Tortricinae of the family Tortricidae.

Species
Palaeotoma styphelana Meyrick, 1881

See also
List of Tortricidae genera

References

 , 2005: World catalogue of insects volume 5 Tortricidae.

External links
tortricidae.com

Schoenotenini